Sijeruk is a village in Banjarmangu, Banjarnegara Regency, Central Java, Indonesia on the island of Java. On , the village was buried under tons of mud and rocks from a landslide. Initial reports indicated between 100 and 190 deaths or missing people. Cijeruk is located approximately 210 miles (340 km) east of Jakarta.

References

External links

CNN

Villages in Central Java